Macroglossum nubilum is a moth of the  family Sphingidae. It is known to inhabit Queensland, Papua New Guinea and the Louisiade Archipelago.

It is similar to Macroglossum prometheus lineata.

References

Macroglossum
Moths described in 1903